Bruce Aisher is an English music producer, music technology journalist and lecturer.  As one half of the duo Brancaccio & Aisher, he has had club hits for labels including Bedrock, Parlophone and his own Player One Records. Brancaccio & Aisher are  known for "It's Gonna Be... (A Lovely Day)" which reached No. 1 in the US Billboard Club Chart and became a UK Top 40 hit. Aisher first began his production career at Cheeky Records with producer Rollo, which led to him working on Dido's platinum-selling No Angel album, on which contributed synthesizer effects and keyboards. Aisher also records and remixes under the alias of Gutterstylz.

See also
List of artists who reached number one on the U.S. dance chart

References

External links
 Homepage
 Bruce Aisher at Discogs

Living people
Musicians from Brighton and Hove
Place of birth missing (living people)
Year of birth missing (living people)